Aculepeira carbonarioides is a spider in the orb-weaver family (Araneidae).

A. carbonarioides reportedly stays in the center of its web during daylight hours.

References

Aculepeira
Spiders of the United States
Spiders of Canada
Spiders described in 1892